Westpark may refer to:

 Westpark (Aachen), a park in Aachen, Germany
 Westpark (Munich), a public park in Munich, Germany
 Westpark (Munich U-Bahn), a railway station
 Westpark Cemetery, Johannesburg, South Africa
 Westpark Tollway, Houston, Texas, US
 Westpark Music, a German record label

See also
 West Park (disambiguation)
 Westpark Elementary School (disambiguation)